Cupid's Target is a 1915 American silent comedy film featuring Oliver Hardy.

Plot

Cast
 Oliver Hardy as Bob (as Babe Hardy)
 Frances Ne Moyer as Lucy
 Jerold T. Hevener as Marty
 Harry Lorraine as Waters
 C. W. Ritchie

See also
 List of American films of 1915
 Oliver Hardy filmography

External links

1915 films
American silent short films
American black-and-white films
1915 comedy films
1915 short films
Silent American comedy films
Lubin Manufacturing Company films
American comedy short films
1910s American films